Tamara Georgievna Morshchakova is a Soviet and Russian jurist. She worked as a judge in the Russian Constitutional Court. Tamara Morshchakova was a member of the Russian Presidential Council for Civil Society and Human Rights until 2019.

Biography
Tamara Morshchakova was born on March 28, 1936 in Moscow.

She was a Judge of the Russian Constitutional Court from 1991 to 2002. Tamara Morshchakova participated in developing of many laws, including 1993 Russian State Constitution, participated in developing of a project of the Law about Constitutional Court of Russia.

Tamara Morshchakova was elected in 2013 for the Commissioner from Europe and Commonwealth of Independent States (CIS), an international institution inside the International Commission of Jurists, and then re-elected in 2018.

Presidential Council for Civil Society and Human Rights 
Tamara Morshchakova was a long time member of the Russian Presidential Council for Civil Society and Human Rights, approx. since 2000s, when the Council's head was Ella Pamfilova. She resigned from the Council on October 21, 2019, when President Vladimir Putin had dismissed 5 core members of the Council (Higher School of Economics' professor Mikhail Fedotov, political analyst Ekaterina Schulmann, rights lawyer Pavel Chikov, Higher School of Economics' professor Ilya Shablinsky, rights lawyer Yevgeny Bobrov), saying that the former Council, that was intended for human rights, had disappeared, and she doesn't want to work in the new Council, if the Council is intended for other else tasks.

Publications 
Tamara Morshchakova is author of about a hundred of publications on the Law and Rights, including these (listed in Russian original language)
 "Эффективность правосудия и проблемы устранения судебных ошибок", в соавторстве [Efficiency of Justice and problems redressing forensic errors, co-author]  (1975);
 "Теоретические основы эффективности правосудия", в соавторстве [Theoretical bases of judicial efficiency, co-author] (1980),
 "Оценка качества судебного разбирательства по уголовным делам" [Ranking of the quality of forensic inquiry in the criminal cases] (1988),
 "Судебная реформа" [Justice reform] (1990);
 Учебник уголовного процесса, соавтор [Learning book on criminology process, co-author] (1990, 1995, 1998, 1999)

References

1936 births
Living people
Constitutional court women judges
Judges of the Constitutional Court of Russia
Honoured Scientists of the Russian Federation
Russian judges
Russian jurists
Russian women judges
Soviet jurists
20th-century Russian women
Academic staff of the Higher School of Economics
Moscow State University alumni